The Accuracy International AX50 is a .50 BMG anti-materiel precision rifle manufactured by British firearms company Accuracy International. 

Devised as an upgrade to the AW50 rifle, the AX50 is built to withstand sustained, heavy usage and constant military deployment. It was designed to allow the operator a high level of accuracy and performance in harsh conditions.

History
The AX50 is a variant of the AX series of sniper rifles that entered production in 2010. Designed by Accuracy International to meet the modern demands of military and police units alike, the AX50 Is designed with long range precision accuracy in mind for a more accurate anti-materiel weapon. 

According to Accuracy International, the development of the series was partly influenced by the Precision Sniper Rifle (PSR) U.S. Special Operations Command solicitation, an undertaking by the U.S. military for a new and improved Precision long range rifle. The PSR contract was ultimately granted to Remington's Modular Sniper Rifle.

Design
The rifle itself is built on an aluminum chassis, and has a stock which can be folded to the left to shorten the overall length of the rifle when needed, and features a two-stage trigger with a 3.3 to 4.4 lbs. adjustable pull. The receiver and bolt featuring a 60° bolt throw are made of steel. The AX50 comes with an integrated Picatinny rail as well as a "Firing pin cocking indicator" safety allowing the user to ascertain whether a cartridge is chambered.
Accuracy International actively promotes fitting the Schmidt & Bender PM II / MILITARY MK II product line as sighting components on their sniper rifles and sells these telescopic sights as accessories, which is rare for a rifle manufacturer.

Variants

The AX sniper rifle series comprises variants which were designed for various cartridges.
 AXMC multi calibre sniper rifle that can be chambered either in .338 Lapua Magnum, 300 Winchester Magnum or 7.62×51mm NATO/.308 Winchester when it is reconfigured by changing the 22 mm (0.87 in) diameter bolt, magazine/insert, and barrel.
 AX308 non-multi calibre sniper rifle chambered in 7.62×51mm NATO/.308 Winchester using a 20 mm (0.79 in) diameter bolt.
 AX50 non-multi calibre anti-materiel rifle chambered in 12.7×99mm NATO/.50 BMG using a 30 mm (1.18 in) diameter bolt.

Users
*
: AX-50 used by the Cypriot Special Forces. 
: the standard anti-materiel precision rifle for the Royal Danish Army.
: In service with Turkish Police Special Operation Department.
: It has replaced the AW50 as the British Army's standard .50 BMG rifle.

See also
List of sniper rifles

References

External links

AX50

.50 BMG sniper rifles
Bolt-action rifles of the United Kingdom
Sniper rifles of the United Kingdom